The Scandinavian electro-pop scene kickstarted with the invention of the Nordik Beat sound in Stockholm in the late 1980s. By merging the new technologies at the time, building small inexpensive studios armed with computers and samplers rather than traditional instruments and studio equipment, and the latest dance music trends (house, techno, hip-hop, electro, etc.) with the Scandinavian focus since ABBA on mixing strong pop melodies with catchy hooks, both a new sound and a new way of making music were born. A commonly recognized birth date for the movement has become the October 1987 cover story of ID Magazine in the UK, a cover graced by the first international Afro-Scandinavian pop star, La Camilla from Army of Lovers, as the face of the brand new Nordik Beat movement.

Sonet Records
A loose network of musicians, artists, record labels and associated clubs soon begun to appear. One of the two main centers was Sonet - Scandinavia's leading independent record company in the 1980s and until its sale to Polygram in 1992, with a market share of 20% for all music sales in Scandinavia. Sonet was the natural investor and distributor for the various Nordik Beat record labels. Sonet's own dance label, Ton Son Ton, was led by songwriter, artist and record producer Alexander Bard, whose band Army of Lovers became one of the leading acts of the new scene with global record sales in excess of 7 million between 1990-1995.

Swemix
The second center was Swemix, a loose but large and highly influential DJ collective which was soon turned into a proper record company of its own. Swemix fostered such influential talents as Denniz Pop, Douglas Carr, Stonebridge and SoundFactory, all with enormous influence on international pop and dance music throughout the 1990s and beyond. It was quite typical for this egalitarian and playful scene that Army of Lovers made their records with Swemix and Swemix was distributed by Sonet. Other Nordik Beat labels associated with Sonet and Swemix were Telegram (which signed soul vocalist Titiyo, sister of Swedish artists Neneh Cherry and Eagle-Eye Cherry, and ragga/dancehall star Papa Dee) and Ricochet (the home of more R&B-inspired artists such as Robyn and Jennifer Brown).

Division
The Nordik Beat scene divided in the 1990s into an international hit factory of production powerhouses like Cheiron Studios (the home of Denniz Pop, Douglas Carr, and Max Martin, who became the songwriters and producers of both Swedish artists like Army Of Lovers, E-Type, Robyn, Ace of Base, Kayo and Dr Alban, and international stars such as Backstreet Boys, Britney Spears, N-Sync, Pink and Kelly Clarkson) Murlyn Music (the home of Anders Bagge, Arnthor Birgisson and Bloodshy & Avant, who became the songwriters and producers of artists such as Jennifer Lopez, Celine Dion, Kylie Minogue, Madonna and Jordin Sparks) and Eclectic (the home of Anders Hansson and Johan Aberg who wrote for and produced artists like Christina Aguilera and Cher). But the Nordik Beat scene also fathered the Scandinavian dance music scene whose godfather ever since the 1980s was Stonebridge, later followed by DJs, songwriters and producers like Axwell, Sebastian Ingrosso, Steve Angello and Eric Prydz.

Following the folding of Sonet into Polygram (later Universal Music) in 1992, the new independent record label Stockholm Records - led by Ola Håkansson of Secret Service fame and Alexander Bard of Army Of Lovers fame - took over the role as the leading independent Scandinavian record company and distributor of new music. Stockholm Records' major signings included acts as varied as Army of Lovers, The Cardigans, E-Type, Stakka Bo (later even more successful as a video director for artists like Madonna, Robbie Williams, Suede and Beyoncé), A-Teens, Vacuum and Lisa Miskovsky. Håkansson and Bard sold Stockholm Records to Universal Music in 1998, after which Bard went back to recording and songwriting and soon achieved international success with disco trio Alcazar.

Expansion
The Swedish scene soon inspired the neighboring countries and major cities. Oslo fostered production supremos Stargate (among the world's most successful songwriters and record producers in the 2000s (decade) with clients including Beyoncé, Rihanna, Jordin Sparks, and their American co-writer and co-producer Ne-Yo). Copenhagen and neighboring Malmö fostered an electronic pure pop scene represented by acts like Aqua, Whigfield, Junior Senior, Basshunter and Alphabeat. Helsinki became the home of Scandinavian computer-produced hard and gothic rock with bands like Apocalyptica, The Rasmus and Sunrise Avenue, whose importance especially in the German market has been extremely strong since the early 2000s.

Following the Nordik Beat years, Sweden has continued to produce pop with smartness and self-confidence well into the new century. Indie pop acts like The Concretes, Shout Out Louds, Lykke Li, The Tough Alliance, Pacific and others express themselves using traditional instrumentation with melodies and hooks recorded on computers, But perhaps most interesting is the contemporary electro scene in Stockholm which includes both old faces returning in new guises, such as Robyn and Alexander Bard (with his new band Bodies Without Organs) and fresh new names who, inspired by the Nordik Beat tradition, use computers to catch and communicate the soul of music, such as The Knife, Kleerup, Jenny Wilson and September. In this department, it is hard to overrate the influence of a parallel Scandinavian music phenomenon, that of the Icelandic wave emanating from Reykjavík, fronted by Björk and Sigur Rós. Hardly surprising, the Swedish electro acts have also been collaborating extensively with Danish electro acts such as Trentemøller and Norwegian electro acts such as Röyksopp.

Nordic music
Pop music genres